Ashley William Goldsworthy  (born 2 November 1935) is an Australian computer scientist and business executive. He was federal president of the Liberal Party of Australia from 1990 to 1993. He is deputy chair of the Brisbane Catholic Education Council, and a director of the anti-same-sex marriage lobby group Marriage Alliance.

Career

Professor Goldsworthy has Degrees in accounting, business, science, public administration, theology, and canon law.

As Chairman of the Education & Training Committee of the Business Council of Australia, Professor Goldsworthy was instrumental in establishing the Business/Higher Education Round Table, which was launched by the Governor-General in 1990. He was B-HERT Director 1990-95 and 2008 to date; President 1995–97; Executive Director 1997–2008.

He has an extensive business career with roles including former Chairman/CEO of billion dollar corporations, both domestic and international, in construction (of what was then the largest construction company in Australia), housing, hotel, gaming (casinos), property development, information technology, and banking and insurance industries.

Professor Goldsworthy's current roles include:
 He is currently Chairman/CEO of companies in the fields of information technology, education and training, finance, and human resources.
 Honorary Treasurer of the La Pacifique Apartments Body Corporate.

Former roles held by Professor Goldsworthy:
 Dean of the School of Business and Professor of Leadership at Bond University.
 Federal President and Life Member of the Liberal Party
 Member of Federal Government's Industry Research & Development Board; Australian-American Fulbright Commission; Australian Science and Technology Council; Australian Payments System Council; National Library; and Australian Law Reform Commission;
 Chairman of the Centre for International Research on ICT at RMIT University
 President and CEO of the Australian Computer Society
 World President of the International Federation for Information Processing, and in 1999 achieved the rare honour of being elected an Honorary Member of that body.
 Prior to his business career he was Director of Economic Statistics for the Australian Government.

Community service
Community service includes work for:
Scout Association
Arthritis Foundation
Salvation Army Red Shield Appeal
National Gallery of Victoria
Queensland Theatre Company (Chairman)
Australian Ballet
Queensland Ballet (Life Member)
Queensland Performing Arts Trust.

Recognition
He was awarded
 Officer of the Order of the British Empire (OBE) in 1982
 Officer of the Order of Australia (AO) in 1991
 Centenary Medal in 2003
 Knight of Malta (KM) in 2009
 In 1996 the People's Republic of China honoured him by electing him a Fellow of the Chinese Institute of Electronics.
 He was inducted into the Pearcey Hall of Fame

References

1935 births
Living people
People from Culcairn
Academic staff of Bond University
Officers of the Order of Australia
Recipients of the Centenary Medal
Liberal Party of Australia
Australian Officers of the Order of the British Empire
Knights of Malta
Fellows of the Australian Academy of Technological Sciences and Engineering